Charles "Charlie" W. Scharf (born April 24, 1965) is an American investment banker and business executive who serves as the chief executive officer and president of Wells Fargo. He was previously the CEO of Visa Inc. and BNY Mellon, and has been an independent director on the Microsoft board of directors since 2014.

Early life
Scharf received a B.A. from The Johns Hopkins University and an M.B.A. from New York University. In 1987, shortly after graduating from college, Scharf was the youngest professional employee at Commercial Credit Corp. Scharf was still a senior at Johns Hopkins University when he started working at the company part-time, having sent his résumé to Jamie Dimon through family connections.

Scharf completed his Executive MBA from Stern in 1991, which he said helped put his work experience into perspective: "In my experience, good business is all about stepping back, asking questions, and accumulating the expertise to make the best decisions, whether those are business decisions or people decisions."

Early career
Prior to joining Visa in November 2012, Scharf was the CEO of Retail Financial Services for JPMorgan Chase & Co. for nine years from July 2004 until June 2012. He was also the managing director of One Equity Partners, JPMorgan's private investment section. He was the CEO and CFO at Bank One Corp. prior to his work at JPMorgan Chase & Co from 2000 to 2002. From 1999 to 2000, he was the CFO of the Global Corporate and Investment Bank division at Citigroup, Inc. From 1995 to 1999 he was the CFO at Salomon Smith Barney.

Career
At age 47, Scharf took over as Visa's CEO in November 2012, succeeding Joseph Saunders. He was also appointed as a board member after increasing the size of the board to eleven members from ten. Scharf received a total compensation of $24.20 million, including base salary, stock grants and incentives in 2013. Under Scharf's tenure, Visa placed at number 238 on the Fortune 500, with $11.7 billion in revenue.

On October 17, 2016, Scharf advised his Board of Directors that he can no longer spend enough time in San Francisco "to do the job effectively". He announced that he would step down on December 1. Charlie served as chief executive officer of Bank of New York Mellon from July 2017 to October 2019 and the chairman of its board from January 2018 to October 2018.

On September 27, 2019, Scharf's appointment as President and CEO of Wells Fargo was announced. "Chainsaw Charlie," as he has come be known within the company, has committed to major cuts within the company. Scharf said he would continue to live in New York with his family and commute frequently to Wells Fargo's headquarters in San Francisco. The Washington Post said his "broad experience makes Scharf a safe political choice, who is already well known by both regulators and lawmakers". On November 7, 2019, Scharf announced that he had appointed BNY Mellon Vice Chairman and former U.S. Secretary of Commerce and White House Chief of Staff Bill Daley to serve as head of Public Affairs for Wells Fargo effective November 13, 2019.

Nonprofit leadership
Scharf is on the board of trustees for Johns Hopkins University and he is on the board of directors for the Financial Services Roundtable.

On February 26, 2014 President Barack Obama announced his intent to nominate individuals to key Administration posts amongst which was Charles W. Scharf, Appointee for Member, President’s Advisory Council on Financial Capability for Young Americans.

He is currently on the Executive Council for UCSF Health and the Board of Directors for Microsoft Corp.

Comments about diversity
During a September 2020 meeting held over a video call, Scharf drew both criticism and praise for comments about Blacks in the workforce when he claimed that Wells Fargo faced issues reaching diversity goals because there was not enough qualified minority talent to draw from. On June 18, 2020, he had sent out a company memo, saying: “While it might sound like an excuse, the unfortunate reality is that there is a very limited pool of black talent to recruit from.” Similar comments in the zoom meeting reportedly angered a couple of unidentified black employees of the company. However, the same report indicated that, "Not all attendees recalled being offended. 'The meeting was incredibly constructive... I walked away being incredibly surprised at how genuine and sincere he is,' said Alex David, president of the Black/African American Connection Team Member Network." But Ken Bacon, a prominent black executive with Comcast, was "shocked and puzzled" by Scharf’s comments, and Alexandria Ocasio-Cortez referred to Scharf’s comments on Twitter, highlighting his "lack of talent to recruit Black workers".

References

1965 births
American chief executives of financial services companies
Johns Hopkins University alumni
Living people
New York University Stern School of Business alumni
Wells Fargo employees
Directors of Microsoft